Anderstorps IF is a sports club in Anderstorp, Sweden, established in 1927.

The women's soccer team played in the Swedish top division in 1979.

Billy Lansdowne and Billy Lansdowne Junior have both played games for the club.

References

External links
Official website 

1927 establishments in Sweden
Football clubs in Jönköping County
Sport in Jönköping County
Association football clubs established in 1927